Sean's Bar is a pub in Athlone, Ireland, notable for its reputed establishment in AD 900, and claim to being the oldest extant bar in both Ireland and Europe. Other architectural and archaeological records, including the Record of Monuments and Places and the National Inventory of Architectural Heritage, date the building to the 17th or 18th century.

Age and history 

Archaeological research, reviewed by the National Museum of Ireland, indicates that a pub may have been operating on the site for at least a millennium, with the building possibly being older. Carbon-dated material such as mud, wood and wattle, as well as the presence of tavern tokens (of an unspecified age), now on display in the National Museum of Ireland, have further supported "the legend" of the pub's age. During renovations in the 1970s, it was discovered that a back wall was partly made of wattle and wicker.

Other archaeological surveys indicate that the oldest parts of the building were constructed in or around the 17th century, with some more ancient materials perhaps having been scavenged and reused from elsewhere.

In 2004, Guinness World Records issued a certificate to Sean's Bar as the "oldest pub in Ireland". The proprietors have claimed to possess a list of "nearly all previous owners" going back centuries, potentially to the time of Luan, after whom Athlone town is named.

In February 2021 the owners of Sean's Bar, in conjunction with other Irish bar owners, won a landmark court case related to insurance pay-outs during the COVID-19 pandemic in Ireland.

See also
 History of Athlone
 The Brazen Head

References

Notes

Sources

External links

Official website

Buildings and structures completed in the 10th century
Buildings and structures in Athlone
Pubs in the Republic of Ireland